The 2022–23 season will be Pécsi MFC's 15th competitive season, 3rd consecutive season in the Merkantil Bank Liga and 52nd year in existence as a football club.

Transfers

Summer

In:

Out:

Source:

Competitions

Overview

Nemzeti Bajnokság II

League table

Results summary

Results by round

Matches

Hungarian Cup

Statistics

Appearances and goals 
Last updated on 13 November 2022.

 

|-
|colspan="14"|Youth players:

 
|-
|colspan="14"|Out to loan:

|-
|colspan="14"|Players no longer at the club:
 
|}

Top scorers
Includes all competitive matches. The list is sorted by shirt number when total goals are equal.
Last updated on 13 November 2022

Disciplinary record
Includes all competitive matches. Players with 1 card or more included only.

Last updated on 13 November 2022

Clean sheets
Last updated on 13 November 2022

References

External links
 Official Website
 UEFA
 fixtures and results

Pécsi MFC seasons
Hungarian football clubs 2022–23 season